Mecyclothorax doesburgi is a species of ground beetle in the subfamily Psydrinae. It was described by Louwerens in 1949.

References

doesburgi
Beetles described in 1949